Cristo Rei Beach is a public beach facing the Bay of Dili in the suco of , East Timor.

Etymology
The beach takes its name from the colossal Cristo Rei of Dili statue immediately to its north.

Geography

On its land side, the beach is surrounded by steep low hills overlaid with Eucalyptus alba savanna woodland, in which small stands of tropical dry forest are developing. The beach and hills are all part of the Areia Branca no Dolok Oan Important Bird Area. 

Due to the beach's sheltered position inside the bay, it has only gentle waves. Immediately to the north of the beach are Cape Fatucama and the Cristo Rei of Dili statue at its peak; the statue is visible from the shoreline, and accessible from the beach's car park via a 570-step concrete staircase.

On the other, eastern, side of Cape Fatucama, and accessible via the same staircase, is Jesus Backside Beach, so named because the Cristo Rei of Dili statue faces in the opposite, western, direction.

At weekends, Cristo Rei Beach is popular with local residents because of its gentle waves and sandy bottom, and food vendors congregate there to hawk packed lunches. On weekdays, the beach is mostly deserted.

Facilities
The beach is separated from its access road, Avenida de Areia Branca, by a stone wall, with entrances surmounted by sculptures of monkeys. On the other side of the Avenida are a car park and shelters that have been described as perfect for a picnic lunch.

In the early years of the 21st century, particular efforts were made to develop the area into a leisure and tourist destination. During the term of East Timor's IV Constitutional Government (2007–2012), various other facilities were constructed at the beach, including gazebos, bathrooms, and water tanks.

See also
 Areia Branca Beach
 One Dollar Beach

References

External links

Beaches of East Timor
Dili Municipality